Shirley Knight Hopkins (July 5, 1936 – April 22, 2020) was an American actress who appeared in more than 50 feature films, television films, television series, and Broadway and Off-Broadway productions in her career, playing leading and character roles. She was a member of the Actors Studio.

Knight was nominated twice for the Academy Award for Best Supporting Actress: for The Dark at the Top of the Stairs (1960) and Sweet Bird of Youth (1962). In the 1960s, she had leading roles in a number of Hollywood films such as The Couch (1962), House of Women (1962), The Group (1966), The Counterfeit Killer (1968), and The Rain People (1969). She received the Volpi Cup for Best Actress for her role in the British film Dutchman (1966).

In 1976, Knight won a Tony Award for Best Featured Actress in a Play for her performance in Kennedy's Children, a play by Robert Patrick. In later years, she played supporting roles in many films, including Endless Love (1981), As Good as It Gets (1997), Divine Secrets of the Ya-Ya Sisterhood (2002), and Grandma's Boy (2006). For her performances on television, Knight was nominated eight times for a Primetime Emmy Award (winning three), and she  received a Golden Globe Award.

Early life
Knight was born in Goessel, Kansas, the daughter of Virginia (née Webster; 1916-1977) and Noel Johnson Knight (1913-1985), an oil company executive. She had a brother and a sister. She spent her young life in Mitchell, Kansas, and later lived in Lyons, Kansas, where she graduated from high school. She began studying to be an opera singer at age 11. 

At the age of 14, she wrote a short story that was published in a national magazine. Knight later attended Phillips University and Wichita State University. After studying at the Pasadena Theatre School she began her film career in 1959. She then went to New York and began her theatre career. She trained in acting with Jeff Corey, Erwin Piscator, Lee Strasberg, and Uta Hagen at HB Studio.

Career

Knight's feature films include The Group (1966), The Dutchman (1967), Petulia (1968), The Rain People (1969), Secrets (1971), Juggernaut (1974), Beyond the Poseidon Adventure (1979), Endless Love (1981), Angel Eyes (2001),
Divine Secrets of the Ya-Ya Sisterhood (2002), Paul Blart: Mall Cop (2009), Our Idiot Brother (2011) and Elevator (2011), in which she plays one of several people trapped in a Wall Street elevator with a bomber.

Knight was cast in 1958 and 1959 as Mrs. Newcomb in 20 of the 29 episodes of the television series Buckskin, with Tom Nolan, Sally Brophy, and Mike Road. She became a Warner Brothers Television contract star who while on breaks from filming feature films appeared in television series such as Maverick, Bourbon Street Beat, Sugarfoot, Cheyenne, and The Roaring 20s.

A life member of The Actors Studio, Knight's stage credits include Three Sisters (1964), We Have Always Lived in the Castle (1966), Kennedy's Children (1975), which earned her the Tony Award for Best Performance by a Featured Actress in a Play, and A Lovely Sunday for Creve Coeur (1979).

She was nominated for the Drama Desk Award for Outstanding Actress in a Play twice, for Landscape of the Body and The Young Man from Atlanta, for which she received another Tony nomination. She also appeared in Come Back, Come Back, Wherever You Are (2009), an original play by Arthur Laurents.

Her television credits include Target: The Corruptors!, The Eleventh Hour, The Outer Limits ("The Man Who Was Never Born"),  The Reporter, The Fugitive, The Invaders, The Virginian, Murder, She Wrote, Thirtysomething, Law & Order, L.A. Law, Law & Order: Special Victims Unit, Maggie Winters, ER,  House M.D., Crossing Jordan, Cold Case, and Hot in Cleveland, among others.

She appeared in various television films, including Playing For Time and Indictment: The McMartin Trial. For the latter, she won both the Emmy Award for Outstanding Supporting Actress in a Miniseries or a Movie and the Golden Globe Award for Best Performance by an Actress in a Supporting Role in a Series, Mini-Series or Motion Picture Made for Television. Her guest performance in thirtysomething earned her a 1988 Emmy for Best Guest Performer in a Drama Series. She won an Emmy in 1995 for her guest performance in the NYPD Blue episode "Large Mouth Bass".

She appeared in the first segment of If These Walls Could Talk. She also had a recurring role on Desperate Housewives.

Personal life and death
Knight was married to American actor and producer Gene Persson from 1959 until their divorce in 1969. They had one child, actress Kaitlin Hopkins (born February 1, 1964).

Her second marriage was to English writer John Hopkins from 1969 until his death in 1998. They had one child, elementary school teacher Sophie C. Hopkins. She and Hopkins raised her daughter with Persson together.

Knight died of natural causes on April 22, 2020, at her daughter Kaitlin Hopkins' home in San Marcos, Texas. She was 83.

Filmography

Film

Television

References

External links

 
 
 Shirley Knight at the Wisconsin Historical Society's Actors Studio audio collection, 1956-1969
 
 TheaterMania.com
 

1936 births
2020 deaths
20th-century American actresses
21st-century American actresses
Actresses from Kansas
Actresses from Los Angeles
American film actresses
American people of English descent
American stage actresses
American television actresses
Best Supporting Actress Golden Globe (television) winners
Outstanding Performance by a Supporting Actress in a Miniseries or Movie Primetime Emmy Award winners
People from Marion County, Kansas
Tony Award winners
Volpi Cup for Best Actress winners
Wichita State University alumni
Phillips University alumni